Nematjan Zakirov (born 1 January 1962) is a former Kyrgyzstani international footballer. Head coach FC Neftchi Kochkor-Ata.

Career

Club
Born in Kochkor-Ata, Zakirov began playing football with local side Alga Frunze in the Soviet leagues. In 1992, he moved to Bulgaria for a spell with Pirin Blagoevgrad in the A PFG. After 1.5 seasons with Pirin, Zakirov joined second division side Velbazhd Kyustendil.

Following his stint in Bulgaria, Zakirov went to Kazakhstan where he played for Astana and Zhetysu. He finished his playing career back in Kyrgyzstan with SKA-PVO Bishkek.

International
Zakirov made five appearances and scored one goal for Kyrgyzstan national football team from 1999 to 2000.

Managerial
After he retired from playing, Zakirov became a football coach. He led Kyrgyzstan from 2003 to 2005, and again in 2007.

Zakirov managed Kyrgyzstan League side FC Abdysh-Ata Kant, and its second division farm team FC Zhivoye Pivo before becoming the manager of Alga Bishkek in February 2013. He resigned in February 2014.

Career statistics

International

Honors

Club
Alga Bishkek/SKA-PVO Bishkek
Kyrgyzstan League (3); 1992, 2000, 2001
Kyrgyzstan Cup  (3): 1992, 2000, 2001

References

1962 births
Living people
Kyrgyzstani footballers
Kyrgyzstan international footballers
Kyrgyzstani expatriate footballers
FC Alga Bishkek players
OFC Pirin Blagoevgrad players
PFC Velbazhd Kyustendil players
FC Zhenis Astana players
First Professional Football League (Bulgaria) players
Expatriate footballers in Bulgaria
Expatriate footballers in Kazakhstan
Kyrgyzstani football managers
Kyrgyzstan national football team managers
FC Alga Bishkek managers
Association football midfielders